Miguel Carvalho may refer to:
Miguel Carvalho (racewalker) (born 1994), Portuguese racewalker
Miguel Carvalho (footballer) (born 1996), Portuguese footballer who played as a goalkeeper
Miguel Carvalho (footballer, born 2005), Spanish footballer